Pauline Kruger Hamilton (1870 – July 8, 1918)
was an American photographer who served as royal court photographer in Vienna, Austria.

Biography 
Her first husband, Frank Hamilton, killed a man in a quarrel and died of tuberculosis soon after being released from prison.
After his death, she moved to Vienna to study painting, took up photography and became friends with Archduke Friedrich.  For five years, thanks to the patronage of Franz Joseph I, she served as the official royal court photographer.
She was a friend of feminist activist May Wright Sewall and corresponded with her from Germany.

She returned to the United States in 1915 to advocate for support for the widows and orphans of World War I.

Her photo of a child in Austria was used for the 1919 American Red Cross annual campaign and membership drive.

Later in her life she was suspected of being a spy, followed by federal agents, and died before charges could be proved. Suspicious that she might be attempting to fake her own death, the Department of Justice sent officials to her funeral who verified that hers was the body in the coffin.

References 

1870 births
1918 deaths
19th-century American photographers
People from Middleton, Wisconsin
American portrait photographers
19th-century American women photographers